The East Aspetuck River is a  river in Litchfield County, Connecticut, in the United States. It flows in a southwesterly direction from its source at Lake Waramaug, in the town of Washington, through the villages of New Preston and Northville, before joining the West Aspetuck River in New Milford, a half a mile before emptying into the Housatonic River. It is a designated "wild trout management area," with special regulations in effect for its entire length.

References

Rivers of Litchfield County, Connecticut
Washington, Connecticut
New Milford, Connecticut
Rivers of Connecticut
Tributaries of Housatonic River